Rebutia neocumingii, the Cuming crown cactus, is a species of cactus in the genus Rebutia, native to Bolivia and Peru. It has gained the Royal Horticultural Society's Award of Garden Merit.

Subspecies
The following subspecies are currently accepted:
Rebutia neocumingii subsp. lanata (F.Ritter) D.R.Hunt
Rebutia neocumingii subsp. pulquinensis (Cárdenas) D.R.Hunt

References

neocumingii
Plants described in 1987